Lionel Poirot (born 8 September 1973 in Châtenay-Malabry) is a French former freestyle swimmer who competed in the 1992 Summer Olympics and in the 1996 Summer Olympics.

References

1973 births
Living people
French male freestyle swimmers
Olympic swimmers of France
Swimmers at the 1992 Summer Olympics
Swimmers at the 1996 Summer Olympics
European Aquatics Championships medalists in swimming
Universiade medalists in swimming
Mediterranean Games gold medalists for France
Mediterranean Games medalists in swimming
Swimmers at the 1991 Mediterranean Games
Universiade silver medalists for France
Medalists at the 1999 Summer Universiade